The Brukenthal National Museum is a museum in Sibiu, Transylvania, Romania, established in the late 18th century by Samuel von Brukenthal (1721-1803) in his city palace. Baron Brukenthal, governor of the Grand Principality of Transylvania has established his first collections around 1790. The collections were officially opened to the public in 1817, making the museum the oldest institution of its kind on the territory of modern-day Romania.

Today, in its extended form, it is a complex comprising six museums, which, without being separate administrative entities, are situated in different locations around the city and have their own distinct cultural programmes.

The Art Galleries
The Art Galleries are located inside the Brukenthal Palace and include a number of about 1,200 works belonging to the main European schools of painting, from the 15th to the 18th century: Flemish-Dutch, German and Austrian, Italian, Spanish and French Schools. The Galleries also include collections of engravings, books, numismatics, and minerals.

Gallery

The Brukenthal Library
The Brukenthal Library is also located inside the Brukenthal Palace. It comprises approximately 300,000 library units (manuscripts, incunables, rare foreign books, old Romanian-language books, contemporary books and specialised magazines) including the highly illuminated 16th-century Brukenthal Breviary, a book of hours.

The Museum of History
The Museum of History is part of a building which is considered to be the most important ensemble of non-religious Gothic architecture in Transylvania. The museum initially focused its activities on representing the historic characteristics of Hermannstadt (Nagyszeben, present Sibiu) and its surroundings, but in time it has come to reflect the entire area of Southern Transylvania.

The Museum of Pharmacology
The Museum of Pharmacology is located in an historical building dated 1569, where one of the oldest pharmacies in present-day Romania was located. It is the basement of this house where Samuel Hahnemann invented homeopathy and developed his version of treatment. Some of his phials and plans are on display. The furniture is in Viennese style. The exhibition is organized on the structure of a classical pharmacy that includes two laboratories, a homeopathic sector and a documentation sector. It contains over 6,000 ancient medical instruments and dispensing tools from the time when Sibiu was home to more chemists than anywhere else in Transylvania. At the front, a reconstructed shop is decked out with wooden counters and stacks of glass jars creating the atmosphere of an 18th-century apothecary. A valuable collection of wooden pharmaceutical jars, marked with paint, is also featured.

The Museum of Natural History
The Museum of Natural History began to take shape in 1849, through the foundation of the Transylvanian Society of Natural Sciences, which had as members important local and foreign figures in science and culture. The collections of the museum comprise over 1 million exhibits (including mineralogy-petrography, palaeontology, botany, entomology, malacology, the zoology of the vertebrates, amphibians, reptiles, as well as ichthyology, ornithology, and the zoology of mammals).

The Museum of Arms and Hunting Trophies
The Museum of Arms and Hunting Trophies reflects the evolution in time of weapons and hunting tools. Important is as well the collection of trophies belonging to the collections Witting and A. Spiess, the last one comprising 1,058 items acquired in 1963. Opened for the public in 1966 in Spiess House, the exhibition contains now over 1,500 units. Some traditional hunting procedures are also exhibited, including contemporary engravings. Aspects of the animal life and suitable times for hunting them are also presented here.

See also
Brukenthal High School
Eyes of Sibiu
Council Tower of Sibiu

External links
 
 Dutch Art in Brukenthal Museum
Virtual tour of the Brukenthal National Museum provided by Google Arts & Culture
 

Museums established in 1817
Art museums and galleries in Romania
National museums of Romania
Palaces in Romania
Buildings and structures in Sibiu
S
History museums in Romania
1817 establishments in the Austrian Empire
19th-century establishments in Hungary
1817 establishments in Romania
Museums in Sibiu County